Mirco Jehiel Cuello (born 21 September 2000) is an Argentine professional boxer. As an amateur, Cuello captured the bronze medal in the bantamweight event of the 2018 Summer Youth Olympics.

Professional boxing career
Cuello made his professional debut against Akihiro Nakamura on 7 November 2020. He won the fight by a first-round knockout. Cuello next met the winless Jayvonne O'Neal on 12 December 2020. He once again won the fight by a first-round knockout. Cuello faced the undefeated Franco Facundo Huanque on 20 February 2021. He won the fight by a fourth-round knockout. 

For his fourth professional appearance, Cuello was booked to face the 22-fight veteran Hector Rolando Gusman on 27 March 2021. He won the fight by a first-round knockout. Cuello faced another undefeated opponent, Jorge Almanza, on 13 November 2021. He won the fight by a second-round technical knockout. In his final fight of the year, Cuello overcame Sergio Armando Villalobos by unanimous decision, the first decision victory of his professional career.

Cuello faced the 21–4 Leonardo Padilla for the vacant WBA International featherweight title on 23 June 2022. He won the fight by a second-round technical knockout. Three months later, on 3 September 2022, Cuello faced the undefeated Michel Da Silva for the vacant South American featherweight title. He won the fight by a first-round technical knockout.

Cuello made his first WBA International featherweight title defense against the undefeated Leivy Frias on 21 January 2023. He retained the title by a first-round technical knockout.

Professional boxing record

References

External links
 

2000 births
Living people
Argentine male boxers
Olympic boxers of Argentina
Boxers at the 2020 Summer Olympics
Sportspeople from Santa Fe Province
Boxers at the 2018 Summer Youth Olympics